Organized Konfusion is the debut album by Queens Hip Hop duo Organized Konfusion. The album was released on October 29, 1991 under Hollywood BASIC. The album and the group have received a large cult following throughout the years. The record was originally given a rating of 4 out of 5 in The Source in January 1992. The effort has received perfect ratings from many sources, including Allmusic and RapReviews. Group members Pharoahe Monch and Prince Po were praised for their highly skilled lyrical ability, making use of intelligent vocabulary and metaphors. The content on the album ranges from light-hearted tales ("Who Stole My Last Piece of Chicken?" "Audience Pleaser"), to extreme, politically influenced songs ("Releasing Hypnotical Gases," "Prisoners of War"), to religious influence ("Open Your Eyes"). AMG writer Stanton Swihart wrote in All Music's album review:

—Stanton Swihart

Track listing
All tracks produced by Organized Konfusion

Singles chart positions

References

Organized Konfusion albums
1991 debut albums
Hollywood Records albums